Volcana (Claire Selton) is a supervillain in Superman: The Animated Series. Voiced by Peri Gilpin, she made her first appearance in the episode "Where There's Smoke".

Fictional character biography

Superman: The Animated Series
Introduced in the episode "Where There's Smoke", Claire Selton showed an aptitude for pyrokinesis as a teenager. Her parents sent her to Metropolis' Center for Paranormal Studies to help her learn to control and develop her powers, but she was taken by government agents, who "stripped away her past, code-named her Volcana, and tried their hardest to turn her into a living weapon" according to the center's director.

Volcana eventually escaped the agents, became a fugitive, and survived by stealing. While attempting to leave Metropolis, she encounters and briefly fights Superman before escaping. She later seeks out her fence Donnie, she is confronted by agents sent to recapture her, led by Kurt, the agent who originally kidnapped her. They capture and take her to an underground facility with the intention of selling her to another government for dissection purposes and discovering the source of her powers. Meanwhile, Superman locates and interrogates one of the agents before rescuing Volcana, who destroys the facility and attempts to seek revenge on Kurt. While she inadvertently ignites hydrogen canisters, which explode and stun her, Superman evacuates the facility and takes Volcana to a deserted island where she cannot hurt anyone else, promising to deliver her food from time to time. Volcana also makes a cameo appearance in the episode "Unity", in which she fights Supergirl.

Justice League and Justice League Unlimited

As of the Justice League episode "Only a Dream" Pt. 1, Volcana took on more villainous tendencies and was incarcerated in a Metropolis prison before taking advantage of a prison riot to escape alongside Firefly. Additionally, she makes a minor appearance in the episode "Hereafter" Pt. 2 while the government project who kidnapped her is revealed to have been part of Project Cadmus throughout the series.

As of the Justice League Unlimited episode "To Another Shore", she has developed the ability to fly under her own power and joined Gorilla Grodd's Secret Society. Prior to and during the episodes "Alive!" and "Destroyer", Lex Luthor takes over command of the Society, but Grodd mounts a mutiny. Volcana sides with the former before Darkseid attacks and kills most of the Society. In response, Luthor, Volcana, and the other survivors join forces with the Justice League to thwart Darkseid's invasion of Earth.

Power and abilities 

Volcana possesses pyrokinesis, which allows her to coat her body in fire and project fire blasts without harming herself. As such, she requires oxygen to fuel her powers.

Comics
Volcana appears in issues #20 and #41 of the Superman Adventures comics, which are based on her appearances in the DC Animated Universe.

In other media

Video games
 Volcana appears as a boss in Superman: Shadow of Apokolips, voiced again by Peri Gilpin. 
 Volcana appears as a boss in Superman: Countdown to Apokolips, voiced again by Peri Gilpin.

Merchandise
Volcana received a figure in Mattel's Justice League Unlimited tie-in toy line as part of a three-pack with Hawk and Green Arrow.

References

External links
 Volcana bio on the official Batman Superman Adventures homepage
 Volcana in The Justice League Watchtower at toonzone.net
 Volcana in the DC Animated Universe Wiki at wikia.com

Animated characters introduced in 1998
Characters created by Bruce Timm
DC Animated Universe original characters
DC Comics female supervillains
DC Comics metahumans
Female characters in animation
Fictional characters with fire or heat abilities
Fictional professional thieves
Television characters introduced in 1998